Beethoven Del Valle Bunagan (born December 17, 1969), known professionally as  Michael V. and also known as Bitoy, is a Filipino actor, comedian, and recording artist, who appears in the GMA Network show Bubble Gang and Pepito Manaloto.

Known for his literal "translations" and parodies of popular Filipino and foreign songs. Michael V. has also made original songs, such as "Sinaktan Mo ang Puso Ko" (English: "You Hurt My Heart") and "Hindi Ako Bakla" (English: "I'm Not Gay").

Early life
Michael V. was born as Beethoven Del Valle Bunagan on December 17, 1969, at Clinica dela Rosa in Malate, Manila to Cesar Felix Bunagan and Melba Balonzo del Valle. His father named him after German composer Ludwig van Beethoven, upon seeing a copy of Beethoven's LP in his boss' office, not knowing that "Beethoven" is a surname.

The nickname "Bitoy" was taken from a kiddie TV character played by comedian Bentot. When Bentot, as Bitoy, guested in Iskul Bukol, then-high school student Beethoven saw it and began mimicking Bentot's voice in school. His classmates then called him "Bitoy", to which the nickname stuck to this day. He finished his secondary education in Manila Science High School. Michael V. later earned a degree in mass communications from the Pamantasan ng Lungsod ng Maynila. He joined a lot of contests on TV. In one contest in Eat Bulaga!, judge Ogie Alcasid turned him down. Later, Michael V. became a co-host of Eat Bulaga! and Ogie Alcasid became one of his close friends and co-star in the long-running Bubble Gang and Tropang Trumpo.

During the popularity of Andrew E., the song "Humanap Ka ng Panget" became wildly popular, to which the then unsigned Beethoven composed a reply song entitled "Maganda Ang Piliin (Ayoko Ng Panget)". At that time, OctoArts was then inviting Michael V.'s female friend and rapping partner, Dianne, to submit a demo tape. In that demo tape, Michael V.'s "Maganda Ang Piliin" was accidentally included. He and Dianne got individual recording contracts. Michael V.'s song and its accompanying album became a hit.

When he entered show business, he and his manager were deciding a stage name for his career as a rapper. Back then, the most popular Filipino rappers were Andrew E. and Francis M. so they opted for a similar stage name: "Michael V.", after Michael Jackson and Gary V., Michael V.'s favorite international and local artists respectively.

Michael V.'s first feature film appearance was in Regal Films' comedy film, Banana Split top-billed by Joey Marquez. He eventually gained prominence when OctoArts Films started to include him alongside Vic Sotto, Ogie Alcasid, Francis Magalona, among others.

Career

Television and film career
Michael V. has won the Asian Television Awards for Best Comedy Performance by an Actor for the years 2004, 2005 and 2006. He joined MariMar as the voice of the eponymous character's pet dog Fulgoso. After his voice-acting in MariMar, he played a supporting role in Codename: Asero. On August 23, 2008, Michael V., after winning Best Comedy Performance Award at the Asian Television Awards for three consecutive years—was officially informed that he will grace the front cover of Reader's Digest 5th Annual Humor Special, September issue. Making him the second Filipino whoever landed on the covers of Reader's Digest next to former President Cory Aquino.

Michael V. also had a comedy movie with longtime friend Ogie Alcasid called Yaya and Angelina: The Spoiled Brat Movie produced by GMA Films and APT Productions, inspired from a segment of GMA 7's award-winning gag-show, Bubble Gang. He also hosted a game show on GMA, Hole in the Wall with Ogie Alcasid in 2009.

Michael V. formerly hosted a comedy-talent show called Bitoy's SHOwwwTIME, which aired from 2009 to 2010 and also hosted Kap's Amazing Stories: Kids Edition, while original host Bong Revilla had left the show shortly for re-election as senator, but Bong Revilla won again as Senator a week later. Michael V. also won as a Celebrity Inductee to the Eastwood City Walk Of Fame Philippines in 2009. He had his first sitcom entitled Pepito Manaloto currently airing on GMA Network.

In 2010, Michael V. became Nestle Philippines' Laki sa Gatas advocate for Bear Brand Milk. In the same year, He returned to drama via Jillian Namamasko Po! which he plays a Santa Claus which he created a doll and gives to a good little child. In 2011, He appeared in Bantatay which he returns to voice as a dog. It was his 4th GMA Telebabad after Marimar and Codename: Asero and Jillian Namamasko Po!.
In 2016, he conceptualized Tsuperhero along with Caesar Cosme. In the same year, Michael V. leaves Eat bulaga! as a co-host.

Michael V. started his YouTube career in 2017. In 2019, he returns to film and make also his directorial debut film Family History produced by GMA Pictures and Michael V.'s Mic Test Entertainment. Following the passing of former director Bert de Leon in 2021, Michael V. temporarily took charge of the directorial duties for Pepito Manaloto: Tuloy ang Kuwento in June 2022.

Personal life
Michael V. and his wife Carol have 4 children. In August 2013, He was hospitalized for dengue fever, according to a tweet from Ogie Alcasid. Both Ogie Alcasid and Michael V. solicited prayers and platelet donations over the following days, promising to update fans once the situation gets better. Michael V. then later tweeted that he was recovering from his previous condition, thanking his fans for support.

On July 20, 2020, Michael V. announced in a vlog that he had tested positive for COVID-19. On August 11, Michael V. announced in another vlog that he had already recovered.

Filmography

Television

Films

Awards and nominations

References

External links 

1969 births
Filipino male comedians
Filipino male television actors
20th-century Filipino male singers
Filipino pop singers
Filipino male voice actors
Filipino male film actors
People from Malate, Manila
People from Pandacan
Male actors from Manila
Pamantasan ng Lungsod ng Maynila alumni
Living people
Filipino parodists
Parody musicians
GMA Network personalities
PolyEast Records artists
GMA Music artists
Filipino singer-songwriters
21st-century Filipino male singers